Lestonia is a genus of true bugs belonging to the monotypic family Lestoniidae.

Species:

Lestonia grossi 
Lestonia haustorifera

References

Heteroptera
Heteroptera genera